Monica Johanna Petronella "Monique" Bolleboom (born 11 August 1962) is a former artistic gymnast from the Netherlands. She competed at the 1976 Summer Olympics in all artistic gymnastics events with the best achievement of 11th place in the team all-around.

Her sister Ingrid is also a former artistic gymnast.

References

1962 births
Living people
Dutch female artistic gymnasts
Gymnasts at the 1976 Summer Olympics
Olympic gymnasts of the Netherlands
People from Zoetermeer
Sportspeople from South Holland
20th-century Dutch women
20th-century Dutch people
21st-century Dutch women